William P. Eadie (14 June 1882 – 23 June 1915), also known as William Prince, was a Scottish professional footballer who played as a goalkeeper in the Scottish League for Queen's Park, St Mirren and Partick Thistle.

Personal life 
Eadie was born in Dunblane, Scotland had three brothers who each played football – James (Dunblane, Queen's Park), David and Alexander (both Strathallan). As of 1901, he was working as a draper's assistant. On 20 March 1914, Eadie emigrated to Canada. One month after the outbreak of the First World War, Eadie enlisted as a sergeant in the 10th Battalion of the Canadian Expeditionary Force at CFB Valcartier. He enlisted under the name of William Prince. Eadie was killed in action near Saint-Julien, Belgium on 23 April 1915 and is commemorated on the Menin Gate and the Saint Julien Memorial.

Honours 
Dunblane
 Perthshire Cup: 1905–06

Career statistics

References

1882 births
1915 deaths
Scottish footballers
Association football goalkeepers
Queen's Park F.C. players
Scottish Football League players
Canadian Expeditionary Force soldiers
St Mirren F.C. players
Partick Thistle F.C. players
East Fife F.C. players
Canadian military personnel killed in World War I
Sportspeople from Dunblane
Scottish military personnel
Footballers from Stirling (council area)